Milagros de Amor ("Miracles of Love") is a Colombian telenovela first aired in 2002. It stars Maritza Rodríguez, Gregorio Pernía, Edmundo Troya and Carlos Humberto Camacho, and ran for 80 episodes.

Cast
Maritza Rodríguez as Milagros Viuda de Amor
Gregorio Pernía as Miguel Abril / Emilio Luna
Edmundo Troya as Vladimiro Peralta Jr.
Carlos Humberto Camacho as Hernan 'Raton'
Carolina Lizarazo as Xiomara Corrales
Helena Mallarino as Virginia
Vannesa Blandon as Natalia Amor
Gloria Gómez as Ofelia
Julio Medina as Vladimiro Peralta
Carolina Sarmiento as Magaly 'Negra'
César Mora as Cayetano
Ana María Arango as Betsabe
Gustavo Ángel
Paola Diaz as Nelly
Luis Fernando Ardila
Diego León Hoyos
Patricia Polanco as Esther de Corrales
Jorge Cárdenas
Marcela Vanegas
Pilar Álvarez
Geoffrey Deakin as Frank Hannsen
María Elena Döehring as Catalina Pizarro de Hannsen
Freddy Flórez as Fabrizio
Lina María Luna
Andrea Quejuán as Magdalena
Jaider Villa as Camilo Pizarro
Maria Alejandra Lopez

External links

2002 telenovelas
2002 Colombian television series debuts
2002 Colombian television series endings
Colombian telenovelas
RCN Televisión telenovelas
Spanish-language telenovelas
Television shows set in Colombia